Johan Halvardsson (born December 26, 1979) is a retired Swedish ice hockey player who played over 200 games for his hometown team HV71 in the Swedish Elitserien. He retired in 2009 due to recurring injuries.

Halvardsson was a big defenceman who often used his great size and strength for blocking shots, tackling and clearing pucks from the crease, often used on the penalty kill.

Playing career
Halvardsson was drafted in the 1999 NHL Entry Draft by the New York Islanders with their fourth choice, the 102nd overall selection. On May 15, 2006, Halvardsson signed a two-year contract, beginning season 2006–07, with the New York Islanders. He struggled in Islanders' affiliated club Bridgeport Sound Tigers in AHL with only eight games played. On December 1, 2006, he broke his contract and returned to Sweden, signing a one-year contract with his former Swedish club HV71. He later extended his contract with HV71 for another four years.

On June 12, 2009, Halvardsson announced his retirement from hockey due to knee problems. He will take a position as video coach with HV71.

International play
Halvardsson has played for Sweden in the 1999 World Junior Championships.

Career statistics

Regular season and playoffs

International

References

External links

1979 births
Living people
Sportspeople from Jönköping
Bridgeport Sound Tigers players
HV71 players
IK Oskarshamn players
New York Islanders draft picks
Swedish ice hockey defencemen
Swedish expatriate ice hockey players in the United States